Arthur Conway may refer to:
 Arthur Conway (sportsman) (1885–1954), English cricketer and footballer
 Arthur W. Conway (1875–1949), Irish academic